Vasileios Oikonomidis (Vytina, Gortnynia, 1814 – 1894) was a major Greek law professor of the 19th century.

References

Sources 
 
 

People from Vytina
1814 births
1894 deaths